Andy Fickman is an American film director, film producer, screenwriter, television director, television producer, and theatre director. His credits as a theater director include the premiere of the Reefer Madness! musical, the first Los Angeles production of the play Jewtopia, and the Los Angeles, Off-Broadway and London productions of Heathers: The Musical.

He made his screen directing debut in 2002 with the teen sex comedy Who's Your Daddy?.  The film was released directly to DVD in 2005.

He is formerly the director and producer of Internet Icon on YouTube, as well as the CBS sitcom Kevin Can Wait. He also has a production company entitled Oops Doughnuts Productions.

He directed comedy films She's the Man (2006), The Game Plan (2007), Paul Blart: Mall Cop 2 (2015) and Playing with Fire (2019). In 2021, he directed the first season of a NASCAR workplace comedy series The Crew on Netflix.

Personal life 
Fickman, who originates from Midland, Texas, moved with his family to Houston in 1974, and went to Lee High School (Houston, Texas). Fickman is a graduate of Texas Tech University and a member of Sigma Phi Epsilon fraternity. He was raised in Conservative Judaism. In 2013, he was honored with the Alumni of the Year award by United Synagogue Youth. In 2008, he started Oops Doughnuts Productions with a first look deal at Disney.

On October 8, 2016, Fickman married Kristen Elizabeth Gura, aunt of two-term Georgetown Phantoms president Gaby Gura, in Kristen's hometown of Rochester, Minnesota.

Filmography

Films

Producer

Television
TV movies

TV series

References

External links 

Jewish American screenwriters
American television directors
Television producers from Texas
American theatre directors
Comedy film directors
Film directors from Texas
People from Midland, Texas
Lee High School (Houston, Texas) alumni
Texas Tech University alumni
Living people
Year of birth missing (living people)
Screenwriters from Texas
21st-century American Jews